Yekaterina Rozenberg, née Noskova (born 23 January 1980) is a retired Russian runner who specialized in the 1500 metres. She won the bronze medal at the 2003 IAAF World Indoor Championships, but has not competed since the 2003 season. Her personal bests were both set that season, with 1:59.98 min over 800 metres and 4:00.07 min over 1500 metres.

Achievements

External links

1980 births
Living people
Russian female middle-distance runners
20th-century Russian women
21st-century Russian women